The High Commission of New Zealand (Māori: Te Kāinga Māngai Kāwanatanga o Aotearoa i Rānana) in London is the diplomatic mission of New Zealand in the United Kingdom. It is housed in a skyscraper known as New Zealand House on Haymarket, London, off Pall Mall. As well as containing the offices of the High Commissioner, the building also hosts the New Zealand consulate in London and the military attaché.

History
The site had been previously occupied by the Carlton Hotel, destroyed by a bomb during the Blitz. The design differed from the other diplomatic buildings of other Commonwealth countries in that it would be a modern skyscraper, designed by Sir Robert Matthew. After difficulties securing a planning consent, the 18 storey building only proceeded after approval was granted by the British Cabinet. The High Commission was built by Holland, Hannen & Cubitts and was opened by the Queen in 1963. It is the only tall building in this part of London. Since 1995, it has been a Grade II Listed Building.

Responsibilities
It is an overseas post of the New Zealand Ministry of Foreign Affairs and Trade. The current High Commissioner to the United Kingdom is Phil Goff. New Zealand Passport applications can be processed at New Zealand House. The nearest Tube stations to New Zealand House are Piccadilly Circus and Charing Cross. The Māori cultural group Ngāti Rānana holds regular meetings at the High Commission.

Gallery

See also
 List of high commissioners of New Zealand to the United Kingdom

References

External links

 Official website

New Zealand
Skyscrapers in the City of Westminster
London
New Zealand–United Kingdom relations
Grade II listed buildings in the City of Westminster
St James's
Skyscraper office buildings in London